The Bulgarian National Road Race Championships are held annually to decide the cycling champions in the road race discipline, across various categories. The championship was first held in 2000.

Men

See also
Bulgarian National Time Trial Championships
National Road Cycling Championships

References

National road cycling championships
Cycle races in Bulgaria
Recurring sporting events established in 2000